Shaikh Habib Al-Raee was an elevated Sufi saint and maintains a grand status amongst all the Shaikhs. He was a companion to Salman Farsi.  His father, Shaikh Saleem Al-Raee, was the founder and chief ancestor from whom the Arain originate. He related that Muhammad said, “The believer’s intentions are better than his acts.” He had flocks of sheep and his home was on the bank of the Euphrates. His religious path was retirement from this world.

Miracles 
A certain Shaikh relates as follows, “Once I passed by him and found him praying, while a wolf looked after his sheep. I resolved to pay him a visit since he appeared to me to have the marks of greatness. When we had exchanged greetings, I said,”O Shaikh!  I see the wolf in accord with the sheep.” He replied, “That is because the shepherd is in accord with God.”  With those words he held a wooden bowl under a rock and two fountains gushed from the rock: one of milk and the other of honey. ‘O Shaikh!’ I cried, as he bade me drink, ‘how hast thou attained to this degree?’He answered,”By obedience to Muhammad, the Apostle of God. O my son! The rock gave water to the people of Moses, although they disobeyed him, and although Moses is not equal in rank to Muhammad: why should not the rock give milk and honey to me, inasmuch as I am obedient to Muhammad, who is superior to Moses?’ I said, “Give me a word of counsel.” He said, “Do not make your heart a coffer of covetousness and your belly a vessel of unlawful things.”

Spiritual Lineage 
Shaikh Habib Al-Raee was a Tabieen i.e. he was a follower of the Companions of Muhammad.
Muhammad
Suleman Farsi
Shaikh Habib Al-Raee

Ancestral Lineage 
The ancestral lineage of Shaikh Habib Al-Raee is as follows:

Fehr Quraysh/Fihr ibn Malik
Ghalib (patronymic Abu Teem-name Aamir) 
Loee
Qais
Umar
Mugheera
Abdul Dar
Haris
Shaikh Saleem Al-Raee
Shaikh Habib Al-Raee

Shaikh Haleem Al-Raee son of Shaikh Habib Al-Raee also belonged to the Arain (tribe) and migrated with Muhammad bin Qasim to Multan side of Pakistan with his army.

See also 
Tabieen
Taba al-Tabi‘in
Sahaba

References

7th-century Muslims
Tabi‘un
Arain
7th-century Arabs
Sahabah ancestors